Hans Osterfeld "H.O." Lange (13 October 1863 – 15 January 1943) was a Danish librarian and egyptologist. He was chief librarian at the Royal Danish Library.

Biography 
Lange was born in Aarhus to Hans and Catherine Lange. He expressed interest in hieroglyphics as a young man. He graduated from Aarhus Cathedral School in 1881 and studied at the University of Copenhagen  graduating in 1882. In 1883, he was hired at the Copenhagen University Library and in 1885 he joined the Royal Danish Library. From 1899 to 1900 he was employed at the Egyptian Museum in Cairo. He became Chief Librarian at the
 Royal Danish Library in 1901 and served in that role through 1924. He showed great interest in incunabula and increased the library's collection in that area during his tenure.

In 1918 he received an Honorary Doctorate from Lund University. In 1927 he became a member of the Prussian Academy of Sciences.
In 1906 having become a knight in the Order of the Dannebrog. He also became a knight of the Order of Saint Olav.
Since 2001, the Royal Library of Denmark has awarded an annual H.O. Lange Prize in his memory.

Publications
 Danish Research Libraries Library Journal, v.29 (1904) p. 67-70

References

Other sources
 P. Helweg-Larsen (1955)  H.O. Lange. En Mindebog (København:  P. Haase & Søns Forlag) 

1863 births
1943 deaths
People from Aarhus
University of Copenhagen alumni
Academic staff of the University of Copenhagen
Danish librarians
Order of Saint Olav
Knights of the Order of the Dannebrog